Charles P. Bush (March 18, 1809 – 1857) was a politician from the U.S. state of Michigan.

Biography
Bush was born in Ithaca, New York.

A George Peck Bush was enrolled at the Oneida Institute around 1831, then briefly (1833–1834) at Lane Theological Seminary, and then left at the end of 1834 with the other Lane Rebels. It has not been established that the individual who studied at Oneida is the Michigan legislator. The legislator apparently did not speak of these years of his life, and nothing is known about them.

Bush moved to Michigan in 1836, becoming one of the first residents of Handy.

He was elected as a Democrat to the Michigan House of Representatives in 1840 and served until 1843.  In 1844, he was a Presidential elector for Michigan, voting for James K. Polk, who became U. S. President.  In 1846, he was elected to the Michigan Senate and the following year served as President pro tempore of the State Senate.  In 1847, when Governor Alpheus Felch resigned to serve in the U. S. Senate, Bush became the sixth lieutenant governor of Michigan serving under Governor William L. Greenly from March 4, 1847 to January 3, 1848. In 1847, he also cast the deciding vote to move the state capital from Detroit to Lansing.

Bush soon moved to Lansing and was elected to the state constitutional convention in 1850.  Two years later he was a delegate to the 1852 Democratic National Convention, which nominated Franklin Pierce for U. S. President.  In 1855 he was elected as state senator from Shiawassee and Ingham counties.  He drafted the bill which abolished capital punishment in Michigan.

Bush was a successful business man with a  farm in Livingston County was considered one of the best in the state.  He was also considered an effective and forcible speaker.

He died in Lansing at approximately 47 years of age after suffering years of illness.

References
 Political Graveyard

1809 births
1857 deaths
Lieutenant Governors of Michigan
Members of the Michigan House of Representatives
Michigan state senators
19th-century American politicians